There are numerous nationally and locally designated historic sites and attractions in Westchester County. These include architecturally significant manors and estates, churches, cemeteries, farmhouses, African-American heritage sites, and underground railroad depots and waystations. There are sites from pre-Revolutionary and Revolutionary times, as well as battlegrounds. Westchester County also played an important role in the development of the modern suburb, and there are many associated heritage sites and museums.

Some of these landmarks have earned distinction as members of other notable designations including the Hudson River Valley National Heritage Area list. Still others are on New York State's Path Through History or Westchester County's African American Heritage Trail.

National Historic Site
 Saint Paul's Church National Historic Site, Mount Vernon

National Historic Landmarks

According to the National Park Service "National Historic Landmarks (NHLs) are historic properties that illustrate the heritage of the United States. The over 2,600 NHLs found in the U.S. today come in many forms: historic buildings, sites, structures, objects, and districts. Each NHL represents an outstanding aspect of American history and culture." There are 19 NHLs in Westchester County and one NHL District.

 Armour-Stiner House, Irvington
 Edwin H. Armstrong House (Withdrawal of Designation - 03/05/86), Yonkers
 Boston Post Road Historic District (Rye, New York), 5 properties including
 The Jay Cemetery, Rye
 Jay Estate including the 1838 Peter Augustus Jay Mansion, Rye
 Lounsbury
 Marshlands Conservancy, Rye
 Rye Golf Club including Whitby Castle, Rye
 Aaaron Copland House, Cortlandt Manor
 Old Croton Aqueduct, Croton
 John W. Draper House, Hastings-on-Hudson
 The Old Dutch Church, Sleepy Hollow
 The Elephant Hotel, Somers
 John Hartford House, Valhalla
 John Jay Homestead, Katonah
 Kykuit, also known as the John D. Rockefeller Estate, Pocantico Hills
 Lyndhurst, Tarrytown
 Thomas Paine Cottage, New Rochelle
 Philipsburg Manor House, Sleepy Hollow
 Philipse Manor Hall State Historic Site, Yonkers
 Playland, Rye
 Stepping Stones - Historic Home of Bill & Lois Wilson (Stepping Stones Foundation)
 Sunnyside, Tarrytown
 Van Cortlandt Manor, Croton-on-Hudson
 Villa Lewaro, Irvington

National Register of Historic Places listings
Including the 19 NHLs listed above, there are 240 total sites in Westchester County that are listed on the National Register of Historic Places. See also National Register of Historic Places listings in Westchester County, New York, National Register of Historic Places listings in northern Westchester County, New York. A partial list follows:
 Rye African-American Cemetery, Rye
 Bar Building
 Bird Homestead, Rye
 Bolton Priory
 Evangeline Booth House
 Bronx River Parkway
 Bronxville Women's Club, Bronxville
 Bush Lyon Homestead, Port Chester
 The Capitol Theatre, Port Chester
 Caramoor Center for Music and the Arts, Katonah
 Child Welfare Association of Mamaroneck, Mamaroneck
 Church of St. Barnabas
 Church of St. Joseph of Arimathea, Greenburgh
 Jasper F. Cropsey House and Studio, Hastings-on-Hudson
 East Irvington School
 Edgewood House
 Ferncliff Cemetery, Hartsdale
 Glen Island Park and Glen Island Harbour Club (formerly the Glen Island Casino)
 Irvington Town Hall Theater, Irvington
 Jacob Burns Film Center, Pleasantville
 Paramount Center for the Arts, Peekskill
 The Picture House, Pelham
 The Performing Arts Center, Purchase
 Sing Sing Prison, Ossining
 The Square House Museum, Rye
 Tarrytown Music Hall, Tarrytown
 Union Church of Pocantico Hills, Pocantico Hills
 Yonkers Raceway, Yonkers

African American Heritage Trail of Westchester County
 African American Cemetery, Rye
 Ella Fitzgerald Statue, Yonkers
 Foster Memorial AME Zion Church
 Friends Meeting House, Chappaqua
 Jay Estate, Rye
 John Jay Homestead, Katonah
 Monument to 1st Rhode Island Regiment
 Neuberger Museum of Art, Purchase
 Jack Peterson Memorial, Croton
 Philipsburg Manor
 Philipse Manor Hall State Historic Site, Yonkers
 Saint Paul's Church National Historic Site
 Stony Hill Cemetery, Harrison
 Villa Lewaro, Irvington

Local landmarks
Some historic sites may be eligible for the National Register of Historic Places but have not yet been nominated or may never be nominated. Others are governed by local landmark laws.

Historic battle sites
 Battle Hill, White Plains

Historic house museums

 1838 Peter Augustus Jay House, Rye
 Timothy Knapp House and Milton Cemetery, Rye
 Kykuit, Pocantico Hills
 Leland Castle, New Rochelle
 Lyndhurst, Tarrytown
 Thomas Paine Cottage, New Rochelle
 Jacob Purdy House, White Plains

Monuments
 Monument to 1st Rhode Island Regiment

Museums
 Hudson River Museum, Yonkers
 Thomas Paine Memorial Museum, New Rochelle

See also
Historic Hudson Valley
 History of Westchester County
 National Register of Historic Places listings in Westchester County, New York

References

External links
 Westchester County Historical Society

Westchester County, New York